Aporinellus is a genus of insects belonging to the family Pompilidae.

The species of this genus are found in Europe, Southeastern Asia and Northern America.

Species:
 Aporinellus albipennis Priesner, 1960 
 Aporinellus albofasciatus (Radoszkowski, 1877)

References

Pompilidae
Hymenoptera genera